Hilton Hollow is a valley in Stone County in the U.S. state of Missouri.

Hilton Hollow has the name of the local Hilton family.

References

Valleys of Stone County, Missouri
Valleys of Missouri